David Redfern (born 8 November 1962) is an English former footballer who played as a goalkeeper for Rochdale, Wigan Athletic and Stockport County. He also played in the reserve teams of Sheffield Wednesday and Doncaster Rovers.

References

Living people
Rochdale A.F.C. players
Wigan Athletic F.C. players
Stockport County F.C. players
Sheffield Wednesday F.C. players
Doncaster Rovers F.C. players
Gainsborough Trinity F.C. players
Buxton F.C. players
Wakefield F.C. players
1962 births
Footballers from Sheffield
English footballers
Association football goalkeepers